Kempsey Shire is a local government area in the Mid North Coast region of New South Wales, Australia.

Kempsey Shire was formed on 1 October 1975 by the amalgamation of the former Kempsey Municipality and the former Macleay Shire.

The shire also contains a coastal strip that was identified in 2007, and confirmed in 2015, as one of the most socially disadvantaged areas in Australia.

The Mayor of the Kempsey Shire is Leo Hauville, an independent politician.

Suburbs
 Aldavilla
 Burnt Bridge
 Dondingalong
 East Kempsey
 Euroka
 Greenhill
 Kempsey
 Sherwood
 South Kempsey
 West Kempsey
 Yarravel

Towns and localities

Towns and localities in the Kempsey Shire are:

Demographics

At the 2016 census, there were 28,885 people in the Kempsey Shire local government area, of these 50 per cent were male and 50 per cent were female. The median age of people in the Kempsey Shire was 47 years; some nine years older than the national median. Children aged 0 – 14 years made up 17.2 per cent of the population and people aged 65 years and over made up 23.9 per cent of the population. Of people in the area aged 15 years and over, 43.9 per cent were married and 15.7 per cent were either divorced or separated. At the 2011 Census Aboriginal and Torres Strait Islander people made up 11.1 per cent of the population, more than four times the national average.

Following this, the growth between the 2011 Census and the 2016 Census was 2.67 per cent. When compared with total population growth of Australia for the same periods, being 5.78 per cent, 8.32 per cent and 8.81 per cent respectively, population growth in the Kempsey Shire local government area was significantly lower than the national average. The median weekly income for residents within the Kempsey Shire was significantly below the national average, being one of the factors that place parts of the Kempsey Shire in an area of social disadvantage.

At the 2011 Census, the proportion of residents in the Kempsey Shire local government area who stated their ancestry as Australian or Anglo-Celtic exceeded 81 per cent of all residents (national average was 65.2 per cent) and in the 2016 Census, this value was 79.4 per cent compared to the national average of 62.3 per cent. In excess of 62 per cent of all residents in the Kempsey Shire nominated a religious affiliation with Christianity at the 2011 census (62.9 per cent in 2016), which was higher than the national average of 50.2 per cent (49.2 per cent in 2016). Meanwhile, as at the 2011 Census date, compared to the national average, households in the Kempsey Shire local government area had a significantly lower than average proportion (3.3 per cent) where two or more languages are spoken (national average was 20.4 per cent); and a significantly higher proportion (91.9 per cent) where English only was spoken at home (national average was 76.8 per cent).

Council

Current composition and election method
Kempsey Shire Council is composed of nine councillors, including the mayor, for a fixed four-year term of office. The mayor is directly elected while the eight other councillors are elected proportionally as one entire ward. The most recent election was held on 10 September 2016, and the makeup of the council is as follows:

The current Council, elected in 2016, in order of election, is:

See also

Local government in New South Wales

References

 
Local government areas of New South Wales
Mid North Coast
1975 establishments in Australia